Andreas Christou is a political and social figure in the Republic of Cyprus.

Early life
Christou was born in Limassol in 1948. He graduated from Lanition Gymnasium. He studied mechanical engineering in Moscow and was actively involved in the Cypriot Students and Youth Movement. He worked as a mechanical engineer and later on as a senior manager of a Limassol-based Industrial Corporation.

Political career
In the first Municipal Elections, held in 1986, he was elected as a Municipal Councilor. He was also a member of the Sewerage Board of Limassol-Amathus and the Water Board of Limassol

Christou was elected as a Member of Parliament for AKEL, representing the District of Limassol three times. During his term as an MP, he was Chairman of the Parliamentary Committee on Institutions and Merit, Chairman of the Parliamentary Subcommittee on Temporary Civil Servants and a Member of the Parliamentary Committee on Foreign and European Affairs. From 1991 to 2003, he was a Parliamentary Leader and a Member of the National Council.

In 2003 he was appointed Minister of the Interior, remaining in that post until September 2006.

Andreas Christou was elected as the Mayor of Limassol in December 2006.

Christou was actively involved in the social and cultural life of Limassol as member of committees and institutions, as well as participating in glee clubs as guitar player and serenade singer.

Personal

Christou married Kristian Argyridou and has a son and a grandson.

External links

References

1948 births
Living people
People from Limassol
Greek Cypriot politicians
Mayors of Limassol
Cyprus Ministers of the Interior